There have been 3 Naval ships named for Kentucky:

 , an  "Trident" submarine.

There have also been 9 Naval ships named for cities in Kentucky

 , a side wheel steamer, purchased by the Union during the American Civil War
 , a troop transport ship sunk by the German submarine  in 1918
 , a  built during World War II
 , a timberclad gunboat in commission from 1861 to 1865
  was an ironclad steamboat used during the Civil War.
 USS Louisville was the American Line steamship St. Louis renamed and used in 1918 as a troop transport.
  was a heavy cruiser commissioned in 1931 and active in World War II, sustaining several kamikaze hits.
  is a  nuclear attack submarine commissioned in 1986.
 , a  commissioned in 1905

Kentucky